Andeancistrus is a genus of suckermouth armored catfishes native to South America. This genus is diagnosable from all other members of the Chaetostoma group by having a fully plated snout, lacking cheek odontodes that extend past the opercular flap, and by having eight branched dorsal fin rays.

Species
There are currently 2 recognized species in this genus:
 Andeancistrus eschwartzae Lujan, Meza-Vargas & Barriga-S., 2015 
 Andeancistrus platycephalus (Boulenger, 1898)

References

Loricariidae
Fish of South America